Jorge Luis Socías Tuset (born 26 October 1950) is a Chilean former footballer.

He was part of the national team’s 1974 FIFA World Cup squad.

Honours

Player
Universidad de Chile
 Copa Chile: 1979

Manager
Universidad de Chile
 Primera División de Chile (2): 1994, 1995

Everton
 Primera B: 2003

References

External links
 Profile at FIFA.com

1950 births
Living people
Footballers from Santiago
Chilean footballers
Chilean football managers
Chile international footballers
Universidad de Chile footballers
Unión San Felipe footballers
1974 FIFA World Cup players
Deportes Puerto Montt managers
Universidad de Chile managers
O'Higgins F.C. managers
Santiago Wanderers managers
Cobresal managers
Everton de Viña del Mar managers
Cobreloa managers
Unión La Calera managers
Curicó Unido managers
Outfield association footballers who played in goal
Association football midfielders